Park House is the official residence of the Municipal Commissioner of Colombo. The 16 bedroom mansion, is located on Albert Crescent, Cinnamon Gardens, Colombo, Sri Lanka. It was the former official residence of the Mayor of Colombo till 1990 when the residence was shifted to Sirinivasa. Former Municipal Commissioner Badrani Jayawardena has been in residence since 2010, even after she left the post of Municipal Commissioner in 2015.

See also
Sirinivasa

References

Official residences in Sri Lanka
British colonial architecture in Sri Lanka
Houses in Colombo
Manor houses in Sri Lanka